WorldWideWeb (later renamed Nexus to avoid confusion between the software and the World Wide Web) is the first web browser and web page editor. It was discontinued in 1994. It was the first WYSIWYG HTML editor.

The source code was released into the public domain on 30 April 1993. Some of the code still resides on Tim Berners-Lee's NeXT Computer in the CERN museum and has not been recovered due to the computer's status as a historical artifact. To coincide with the 20th anniversary of the research center giving the web to the world, a project began in 2013 at CERN to preserve this original hardware and software associated with the birth of the Web.

History
Tim Berners-Lee wrote what would become known as WorldWideWeb on a NeXT Computer during the second half of 1990, while working for CERN, a European nuclear research agency. The first edition was completed "some time before" 25 December 1990, according to Berners-Lee, after two months of development. The browser was announced on the newsgroups and became available to the general public in August 1991. By this time, several others, including Bernd Pollermann, Robert Cailliau, Jean-François Groff, and visiting undergraduate student Nicola Pellow – who later wrote the Line Mode Browser  – were involved in the project.

Berners-Lee considered different names for his new application, including The Mine of Information and The Information Mesh, before publicly launching the WorldWideWeb browser in 1991. When a new version was released in 1994, it was renamed Nexus Browser, in order to differentiate between the software (WorldWideWeb) and the World Wide Web.

The team created so called "passive browsers" which do not have the ability to edit because it was hard to port this feature from the NeXT system to other operating systems. Porting to the X Window System was not possible as nobody on the team had experience with the X Window System. 

Berners-Lee and Groff later adapted many of WorldWideWeb's components into a C programming language version, creating the libwww API.

A number of early browsers appeared, notably ViolaWWW. They were all eclipsed by Mosaic in terms of popularity, which by 1993 had replaced the WorldWideWeb program. Those involved in its creation had moved on to other tasks, such as defining standards and guidelines for the further development of the World Wide Web (e.g. HTML, various communication protocols).

On 30 April 1993, the CERN directorate released the source code of WorldWideWeb into the public domain. Several versions of the software are still available on the web in various states. Berners-Lee initially considered releasing it under the GNU General Public License, but after hearing rumors that companies might balk at the concept if any licensing issues were involved, he eventually opted to release it into the public domain.

Features
Since WorldWideWeb was developed on and for the NeXTSTEP platform, the program uses many of NeXTSTEP's components – WorldWideWeb's layout engine was built around NeXTSTEP's Text class.

WorldWideWeb is capable of displaying basic style sheets, downloading and opening any file type with a MIME type that is also supported by the NeXT system (PostScript, movies, and sounds), browsing newsgroups, and spellchecking. In earlier versions, images are displayed in separate windows, until NeXTSTEP's Text class gained support for Image objects. WorldWideWeb is able to use different protocols: FTP, HTTP, NNTP, and local files. Later versions are able to display inline images.

The browser is also a WYSIWYG editor. It allows the simultaneous editing and linking of many pages in different windows. The functions "Mark Selection", which creates an anchor, and "Link to Marked", which makes the selected text an anchor linking to the last marked anchor, allow the creation of links. Editing pages remotely is not possible, as the HTTP PUT method had not yet been implemented during the period of the application's active development. Files can be edited in a local file system which is in turn served onto the Web by an HTTP server.

WorldWideWeb's navigation panel contains Next and Previous buttons that automatically navigate to the next or previous link on the last page visited, similar to Opera's Rewind and Fast Forward buttons, or HyperCard; i.e., if one navigated to a page from a table of links, the Previous button would cause the browser to load the previous page linked in the table. This is useful for web pages which contain lists of links. Many still do, but the user interface link-chaining was not adopted by other contemporary browser writers, and it only gained popularity later. An equivalent functionality is nowadays provided by connecting web pages with explicit navigation buttons repeated on each webpage among those links, or with typed links in the headers of the page. This places more of a burden on web site designers and developers, but allows them to control the presentation of the navigation links.

WorldWideWeb does not have features like bookmarks, but a similar feature was presented in the browser: if a link should be saved for later use linking it to the user's own home page (start page), the link is remembered in the same fashion as a bookmark. The ability to create more home pages was implemented, similar to folders in the actual web browsers bookmarks.

See also 

History of the World Wide Web
Wiki

References

External links
Tim Berners-Lee: WorldWideWeb
A Little History of the World Wide Web
Berners-Lee's blog
Weaving the Web, Berners-Lee's book about the conception of the Web.
CERN, Where the Web Was "WWW" born

Free web browsers
Free software programmed in Objective-C
NeXTSTEP software
Public-domain software with source code
1990 software
Discontinued web browsers
History of web browsers
Free HTML editors